The Philippines participated in the 22nd Southeast Asian Games held in Hanoi, Vietnam from 5 to 13 December 2003.

SEA Games performance
The country sent the 600-strong contingent, the biggest sent abroad in the past three editions. The increase in the Gold tally is a reflection of the jacked up number of events the Philippines took part as they bested its dismal tally in Malaysia two years ago.

The Philippines participated in 28 sports. Track and Field wound up as the biggest earner with eight golds to show, followed by Wushu with six and Taekwondo with five.

Medalists

Gold

Silver

Bronze

Multiple

Medal summary

By sports

References

External links
results

Southeast Asian Games
Nations at the 2003 Southeast Asian Games
2003